This is a list of Members of Parliament (MPs) elected in the 1983 general election, held on 9 June. This Parliament was dissolved in 1987.

During 1983-1987 Bernard Weatherill was the speaker, Margaret Thatcher served as Prime Minister, Michael Foot and Neil Kinnock served as Leaders of the Opposition.

Composition
These representative diagrams show the composition of the parties in the 1983 general election.

Note: The Scottish National Party and Plaid Cymru sit together as a party group, while Sinn Féin has not taken its seats. This is not the official seating plan of the House of Commons, which has five rows of benches on each side, with the government party to the right of the Speaker and opposition parties to the left, but with room for only around two-thirds of MPs to sit at any one time.



By-elections
See the list of United Kingdom by-elections.

Two seats were vacant when Parliament was dissolved preparatory to the 1987 general election:
Kirkcaldy – Harry Gourlay (Lab) died 20 April 1987
Lewisham, Deptford – John Silkin (Lab) died 26 April 1987

See also
Results of the United Kingdom general election, 1983

1983
Lists of UK MPs 1983–1987
1983 United Kingdom general election
 Main
UK MPs